Paroreia was a city of ancient Thrace on the borders of Macedonia. It is called by Stephanus of Byzantium a city of Macedonia. Its inhabitants are mentioned by Pliny the Elder under the name of Paroraei. Its site is unlocated.

References

Populated places in ancient Thrace
Populated places in ancient Macedonia
Former populated places in Greece
Lost ancient cities and towns